Phaecadophora fimbriata is a moth of the family Tortricidae. It is found in Thailand, Japan, Taiwan, China, India, Java and New Guinea.

The wingspan is 20 mm. Adults are tawny with numerous fine longitudinal stripes, which are more distinct beyond the cell. The hindwings are dark purplish bronze, although the basal half is greyish.

References

Moths described in 1900
Olethreutini
Moths of Japan
Taxa named by Thomas de Grey, 6th Baron Walsingham